Pachysandra terminalis, the Japanese pachysandra, carpet box or Japanese spurge, is a species of flowering plant in the boxwood family Buxaceae, native to Japan, Korea and China and introduced to eastern North America. The leaves may yellow in direct sunlight or in winter. When growing in a spreading mass of many plants, a dense cover is formed.

The flowers are white, borne above the foliage. In temperate Northern Hemisphere sites they appear late in the month of March and throughout the month of April. The plant is very cold hardy.

The specific epithet terminalis means "ending", and refers to the clusters of leaves which appear at the end of the short stems.

Cultivation
Pachysandra terminalis is cultivated as an ornamental plant, for use as a massed groundcover, low grouped element, or accent plant in the ground. It is a suitable lower plant for container gardening, and shaded or "northside" window boxes. It spreads by new stems sprouting from the spreading root system.

The plant prefers a moist and well-drained soil that is both acidic and rich.  A humus amended loam (acidic pH) soil, with regular organic fertilizer applications and watering-rainfall is optimal. However, the plant is tolerant of neutral to slightly alkaline pH soils, and to periodic dryness, especially in humid and non-arid climates.

Cultivars
Numerous cultivars have been developed for garden use, of which 'Variegata' has gained the Royal Horticultural Society's Award of Garden Merit.

Propagation
Pachysandra terminalis can be propagated by dividing and transplanting clumps, by rooting stem cuttings, or by removing seedlings that have grown through the spread of roots from the main flower.

References

Ohio State University HCS: Pachysandra terminalis; botany and cultivation . accessed 8.28.2012
All world Plants Database

External links
 Missouri Botanical Garden: Pachysandra terminalis (Japanese pachysandra) — horticulture information.

Buxaceae
Flora of Japan
Flora of Korea
Flora of China
Garden plants of Asia
Groundcovers
Rhizomatous plants
Stoloniferous plants